The NFL Alumni Association is a 501(c)(3) nonprofit organization that is composed of former National Football League (NFL) players, coaches, team staff members and associate members who work voluntarily to raise funds for youth-oriented causes and engage in hands-on service to foster the development of "youth through sports and sports through youth". It was founded in 1967.

The NFL Alumni headquarters is in Mount Laurel, New Jersey with an additional 35 chapters across the country. The NFL Alumni is a dues-paying membership association. Anyone who ever played professional football qualifies to join as a Player member while team personnel are Professional Members. Individuals who did not play in the NFL may enroll in a limited category as Associate Members. The cornerstone of the NFL Alumni's fundraising efforts is its Charity Golf Classic Tour which began in 1979. Among its programs for former players is the Dire Need Trust that provides financial assistance for former NFL players in need. Another program is the Pro Legends Speakers Bureau, which books former NFL players for personal appearances around the country.

Since 1982 the NFL Alumni has held the Player of the Year Awards Dinner honoring the top 10 players and coach from the previous NFL season. The players are honored by a voting process in which former players cast ballots for their modern counterparts. Former pros vote only for the positions they once played themselves.

2011 NFL Alumni Player of the Year winners
Quarterback – Matthew Stafford (Lions)
Running Back – Maurice Jones-Drew, (Jaguars) 
Wide Receiver – Hakeem Nicks, (Giants) 
Lineman - Chris Long, (Rams) 
Linebacker – Aldon Smith, (49ers) 
Defensive Back – Brent Grimes, (Falcons)
Player of the Year - Maurice Jones-Drew, (Jaguars) 
Lifetime Achievement - Randall Cunningham

2010 Player of the Year winners
Offense
Quarterback – Philip Rivers, (Chargers)
Running Back – Maurice Jones-Drew, (Jaguars)
Wide Receiver – Roddy White, (Falcons)
Tight End – Jason Witten, (Cowboys)
Offensive Lineman – Josh Sitton, (Packers)

Defense
Defensive Lineman – Ndamukong Suh, (Lions)
Linebacker – Patrick Willis, (49ers)
Defensive Back – Aqib Talib, (Buccaneers)

Special teams
Special Teams Player – Devin Hester, (Bears)

Overall
Player of the Year - Troy Polamalu, (Steelers)

Coach
Coach – Todd Haley, (Chiefs)

Source:

2009 Player of the Year winners
Offense
Quarterback – Drew Brees, (Saints)
Running Back – Chris Johnson, (Titans)
Wide Receiver – Andre Johnson, (Texans)
Tight End – Dallas Clark, (Colts)
Offensive Lineman – Steve Hutchinson, (Vikings)

Defense
Defensive Lineman – Jared Allen, (Vikings)
Pass Rusher – Elvis Dumervil, (Broncos)
Linebacker – Patrick Willis, (49ers)
Defensive Back – Charles Woodson, (Packers)

Special teams
Special Teams Player – Joshua Cribbs, (Browns)

Coach
Coach – Sean Payton, (Saints)

2008 Player of the Year Awards
Offense 
 Quarterback — Peyton Manning (Indianapolis Colts)
 Running Back — Adrian Peterson (Minnesota Vikings)
 Wide Receiver — Andre Johnson(Houston Texans)
 Tight End — Jason Witten (Dallas Cowboys)
 Offensive Lineman — Alan Faneca (New York Jets)

Defense 
 Defensive Lineman — Albert Haynesworth (Tennessee Titans)
 Pass Rusher — DeMarcus Ware (Dallas Cowboys)
 Linebacker — James Harrison (Pittsburgh Steelers)
Defensive Back — Ed Reed (Baltimore Ravens)

Special teams
 Special Teams Player — Leon Washington (New York Jets)

Coach
 Coach — Tony Sparano (Miami Dolphins)

2007 Player of the Year winners
Offense 
 Quarterback — Tom Brady (New England Patriots)
 Running Back — Brian Westbrook (Philadelphia Eagles)
 Wide Receiver — Randy Moss (New England Patriots)
 Tight End — Jason Witten (Dallas Cowboys)
 Offensive Linemen — Jeff Saturday (Indianapolis Colts)

Defense 
 Defensive Lineman — Mario Williams (Houston Texans)
 Pass Rusher — Jared Allen (Kansas City Chiefs)
 Linebacker — Patrick Willis (San Francisco 49ers)
 Defensive Back — Antonio Cromartie (San Diego Chargers)

Special teams 
 Special Teams Player — Devin Hester (Chicago Bears)

Coach
 Coach — Mike McCarthy (Green Bay Packers)

2006 Player of the Year winners
Offense 
 Quarterback — Drew Brees (New Orleans Saints)
 Running Back — LaDainian Tomlinson (San Diego Chargers)
 Wide Receiver — Andre Johnson (Houston Texans)
 Tight End — Todd Heap (Baltimore Ravens)
 Offensive Lineman — Steve Hutchinson (Minnesota Vikings)
  
Defense 
 Defensive Lineman — Jason Taylor (Miami Dolphins)
 Pass Rusher — Aaron Kampman (Green Bay Packers)
 Linebacker — Zach Thomas (Miami Dolphins)
 Defensive Back — Champ Bailey (Denver Broncos)
  
Special teams 
 Special Teams Player — Devin Hester (Chicago Bears)
  
Coach 
 Coach — Sean Payton (New Orleans Saints)

In addition to the Player of the Year Awards, the NFL Alumni also honors past or current players with its Spirit Award for youth-oriented community service, Order of the Leather Helmet Award for individuals who "have made significant contributions to the game of professional football" and the Career Achievement Award given to those "whose accomplishments on and off the field demonstrate the higher values promoted by the organization." The winner of the 2010 Spirit Award was Dallas Cowboys running back Felix Jones.

NFL Alumni Order of the Leather Helmet 
Awarded to individuals who have made significant contributions to the game of professional football.

1978
 Pete Rozelle
 George Halas
 Art Rooney

1979
 Paul Brown
 Red Grange
 Bronko Nagurski

1980
 Don Shula
 Wellington Mara
 Dominic Olejniczak
 Pro Football Hall of Fame

1981
 Lamar Hunt
 Tom Landry

1982
 Bill Bidwill
 Alex Wojciechowicz
 Bud Grant

1983
 F. William Harder
 LeRoy Neiman

1985
 George Preston Marshall
  Weeb Ewbank

1986
 Howard Cosell
 Vince Lombardi
 Vic Maitland

1987
 Ray Scott
 Steve Sabol
 Ed Sabol
 Bert Bell

1988
 Raymond Berry

1989
 Tex Schramm

1990
 Bill Dudley
 Ollie Matson
 Steve Van Buren

1991
 Hugh McElhenny

1992
 Chuck Bednarik
 Art Modell

1993
 Elroy Hirsch
 Marion Motley

1994
 Sid Luckman
 Sammy Baugh

1995
 Otto Graham
 Chuck Noll

1996
 Johnny Unitas
 Curt Gowdy

1997
 Pat Summerall
 Ralph Wilson

1998
 Jim Brown
 Al Davis

1999
 Bobby Mitchell
 Paul Tagliabue

2000
 Len Dawson
 Deacon Jones

2001
 Mike McCormack
 Mel Renfro

2002
 Mel Blount
 Jim Otto
 Jim Tunney

2003
 Tom Flores
 Willie Davis

2004
 Dick Vermeil
 Val Pinchbeck
 Don Weiss

2005
 Larry Wilson
 Joe Greene

2007
 Sonny Jurgensen
 Jack Youngblood

2008
 Eric Dickerson
 John Madden
 Alex Spanos

NFL Alumni Career Achievement Award
Awarded to individuals whose accomplishments on and off the field demonstrate the higher values promoted by the organization.

1981
 Rocky Bleier
 Roger Staubach
 
1982
 Merlin Olsen
 O. J. Simpson

1983
 George Blanda
 Earl Morrall

1985
 Frank Gifford
 Jack Kemp

1986
 Dan Fortmann
 Ray Nitschke

1987
 Willie Davis
 Don Hutson

1988
 Art Donovan

1989
 Bart Starr

1990
 Nick Buoniconti

1992
 Ken Farragut

1993
 Gino Marchetti

1994
 Byron White

1995
 Alan Page

1996
 Mike Reid

1997
 Jerry Richardson

1998
 Dr. Robert Khayat

1999
 Dr. Ed Sutton

2000
 Paul Salata

2001
 Terry Bradshaw

2002
 Steve Largent

2003
 Fred Dryer

2004
 Bob Griese

2005
 Drew Pearson

2007
 Mike Haynes

References

External links
 

National Football League trophies and awards
Sports professional associations based in the United States
Alumni associations
501(c)(3) organizations
Non-profit organizations based in New Jersey
Companies based in Newark, New Jersey
Sports in Newark, New Jersey
Sports organizations established in 1967